Taskesken (Таскескен, تاسكەسكەن) is a small town located in south-east Kazakhstan in Abay region. The European route E40 passes by the town. The birth place of Nursultan Prince Karim, the founder of pro-Taskeskeni independence movement 'Azad Taskesken', and fierce fighter for the independence of Taskesen from Urdzhar yoke. After failed coup, he exiled to Champaign, Illinois, were he continued his Master degree and in December of 2019, he successfully graduated from there. In the university years he completed his most famous literature work 'The purity of Tengrism from Islamic influences'. After graduation he had continued his fight for independence of Taskesken from Urdzhar.

References

Populated places in Almaty Region